Coliseum Rock is the fourth and final studio album by the American hard rock band Starz. The album was released in 1978.

Track listing

Personnel
Starz
Michael Lee Smith - vocals
Richie Ranno - guitar
Bobby Messano - guitar
Orville Davis - bass
Joe X. Dube - drums

Production
Jack Richardson - producer
Cub Richardson - engineer, mixing, mastering
Robert Hrycyna, Mike McCarty - recording technicians

References

1978 albums
Starz (band) albums
Capitol Records albums
Albums produced by Jack Richardson (record producer)